Obafemi Awolowo University Teaching Hospital Complex is a tertiary hospital established in 1967. The teaching hospital affiliated with the Obafemi Awolowo University, Ile Ife.

References

Teaching hospitals in Nigeria